Hermann Haupt (24 January 1873, in Langensalza, Unstrut-Hainich, Thuringia – 2 June 1959, in Halle, Saxony-Anhalt) was a German entomologist who worked mainly on Auchenorrhyncha and Hymenoptera.

He was an intermediate school (Mittelschule) teacher. He described many new species. Haupt’s Hymenoptera and Auchenorrhyncha collections are conserved in the University of Halle-Wittenberg (Geiseltalmuseum Halle) and Biozentum), Staatliches Museum für Tierkunde Dresden (Cicadidae) and Naturkundemuseum Erfurt (other Orders).

References
Anonym 1959 [Haupt, H.] Ent. News 70 244, V-XI
Nonveiller, G. 1999 The Pioneers of the research on the Insects of Dalmatia Zagreb, Hrvatski Pridodoslovni Muzej : 1-390 183
Sachtleben, H. 1960: [Haupt, H.] Beitr. Ent. 10(1/2) 218

1873 births
1959 deaths
People from Bad Langensalza
German entomologists
Hymenopterists